This is a list of flag bearers who have represented Cambodia at the Olympics.

Flag bearers carry the national flag of their country at the opening ceremony of the Olympic Games.

See also
Cambodia at the Olympics

References

Cambodia at the Olympics
Cambodia
Olympic